PS Bangka (previously known as PS Timah Babel) was a football club based in Pangkal Pinang, Bangka-Belitung Islands, Indonesia. They play at Stadion Depati Amir.

History 
PS Timah Babel established in 1970 and the 1970s era had debuted with 8 big break of the Indonesian Competition football, with player like Sanua panjang, sanusi, jamil, udin etc . Since its heyday in the 1970s PS Timah Babel, PS Timah Babel can be said achievements have ups and downs, especially due to the lack of financial support to the club. In the 2011/12 season, with the support of the Provincial Government of Bangka Belitung and Bangka prayer of the entire community, providing extra strength for PS Bangka successful players for the first time rose caste (promotion) to Liga Indonesia First Division in the 2013 season.

In 2019, the club merged with Aceh United to form Babel United.

Stadium 
The club play their home games at Depati Amir Stadium, Pangkal Pinang.

Supporters 
PS Timah Bangka Belitung majority reinforced by local players, have fans club, named Laskar Sekaban (en: Warriors) Supporter Bangka Belitung.

References

External links
Liga-Indonesia.co.id

Football clubs in Indonesia
Defunct football clubs in Indonesia
Association football clubs established in 1970
Association football clubs disestablished in 2019
1970 establishments in Indonesia
2019 disestablishments in Indonesia